In enzymology, an alpha,alpha-trehalose phosphorylase (configuration-retaining) is an enzyme that catalyzes the chemical reaction

alpha,alpha-trehalose + phosphate  alpha-D-glucose + alpha-D-glucose 1-phosphate

Thus, the two substrates of this enzyme are alpha,alpha-trehalose and phosphate, whereas its two products are alpha-D-glucose and alpha-D-glucose 1-phosphate.

This enzyme belongs to the family of glycosyltransferases, specifically the hexosyltransferases.  The systematic name of this enzyme class is alpha,alpha-trehalose:phosphate alpha-D-glucosyltransferase. This enzyme is also called trehalose phosphorylase[ambiguous].

References

 
 
 

EC 2.4.1
Enzymes of unknown structure